Hasanabad-e Kushkak (also Romanized as Ḩasanābād-e Kūshkak; also known as Ḩasanābād) is a village in Bakhtegan Rural District, Abadeh Tashk District, Neyriz County, Fars Province, Iran. At the 2006 census, its population was 1,151, in 289 families.

References 

Populated places in Abadeh Tashk County